The 1997 Laurence Olivier Awards were held in 1997 in London celebrating excellence in West End theatre by the Society of London Theatre.

Winners and nominees
Details of winners (in bold) and nominees, in each award category, per the Society of London Theatre.

Productions with multiple nominations and awards
The following 16 productions, including one ballet and one opera, received multiple nominations:

 8: Tommy
 5: Art, John Gabriel Borkman and Stanley
 4: Martin Guerre and Passion
 3: A Doll's House, Alice in Wonderland, By Jeeves, Guys and Dolls and Who's Afraid of Virginia Woolf
 2: Alice in Wonderland, Smokey Joe's Cafe, The Herbal Bed, Tristan und Isolde and Uncle Vanya

The following three productions received multiple awards:

 4: Stanley
 3: Tommy
 2: Martin Guerre

See also
 51st Tony Awards

References

External links
 Previous Olivier Winners – 1997

Laurence Olivier Awards ceremonies
Laurence Olivier Awards, 1997
Laurence Olivier Awards
Laurence Olivier Awards